Lake Nicholson is a natural lake in South Dakota, in the United States.

Lake Nicholson has the name of John Nicholson, a pioneer who settled there.

See also
List of lakes in South Dakota

References

Lakes of South Dakota
Lakes of Codington County, South Dakota